Fan Yinhua (born 1948) is a vice admiral in the People's Liberation Army of China. He was a delegate to the 10th National People's Congress and a member of the 17th CCP Central Commission for Discipline Inspection. He was a member of the 13th National Committee of the Chinese People's Political Consultative Conference.

Biography
Fan was born in Xian County, Hebei, in 1948. He enlisted in the People's Liberation Army (PLA) in December 1970, and joined the Chinese Communist Party (CCP) in October 1973. He attained the rank of major general (shaojiang) in July 1998. In July 1998, he became deputy head of Organization Division of the People's Liberation Army General Political Department, and was appointed president of the PLA Newspaper Agency in November 2001. He was recalled to the People's Liberation Army General Political Department as secretary-general in January 2003.

He was appointed director of Political Department of the People's Liberation Army Navy (PLAN) in December 2005, and was admitted to member of the Standing Committee of the CCP PLAN Committee, the navy's top authority. In July 2008, he was promoted to become deputy political commissar of the PLAN and secretary of Discipline Inspection Commission, a position he held until August 2011.

He was promoted to the rank of rear admiral (shaojiang) in December 2005 and vice admiral (zhongjiang) in July 2007.

References

1948 births
Living people
People from Xian County
Central Party School of the Chinese Communist Party alumni
People's Liberation Army generals from Hebei
People's Republic of China politicians from Hebei
Chinese Communist Party politicians from Hebei
Delegates to the 10th National People's Congress
Members of the 13th Chinese People's Political Consultative Conference